Nunera is a small village located in surguja districtsurguja district, Chhattisgarh, India. It has a population of just over 2000 people. The village has a post office.

Administration 
Nunera is a Village Panchayat under Bonakal intermediate Panchayat.

Education
The village has two high school 1.H S School KHAMHARIYA. 2.NUNERA SHIVPUR.

References

Villages in Korba district